Doi Suthep (ดอยสุเทพ), is a mountain ("doi") west of Chiang Mai, Thailand. The other peak is known as Doi Pui and is slightly higher.

The vegetation below  is mostly deciduous forest, with evergreen forest above this elevation.

Geography

The Doi Suthep - Doi Pui mountain is part of the Thanon Thong Chai Range, the southernmost subrange of the Shan Highland system.

Creeks flowing eastward down from Doi Suthep include Huai Kaew (ห้วยแก้ว), Huai Kok Ma (ห้วยคอกม้า), Huai Pha Lat (ห้วยผาลาด), Huai Mae Nai (ห้วยแม่ใน), and others. The creeks all flow into the Ping River.

Waterfalls located east of the summit of Doi Suthep include:

Monthathan Waterfall (น้ำตกมณฑาธาร), located in the evergreen rainforest
Sai Yoi Waterfall (น้ำตกไทรย้อย), located in the evergreen rainforest
Huai Kaew Waterfall (น้ำตกห้วยแก้ว), located just downstream of Pha Ngoep (ผาเงิบ) cliff and Wang Bua Ban (วังบัวบาน) pond
Maa Hai Waterfall (น้ำตกรตาดหมาไห้), located on the southern slopes of Doi Suthep

Geology
The mountain consists of uniform Lower Carboniferous granite which was originally formed underground  330 million years ago. It was uplifted  50 million years ago during the Himalayan Orogeny. Mid-Ordovician shale,  475 million years old, is located south of the peak in the southern part of the national park.

Temple
The temple Wat Phra That Doi Suthep is on top of a hill (around ) forming Doi Suthep. This Buddhist place of worship dates back to the 14th century. It is an important venue for the devout and a legend featuring a white elephant is connected to this revered site. There are views of Chiang Mai city and its surroundings from the top of this mountain.

National park
This mountain is part of the Doi Suthep-Pui National Park. The park was established in 1981 and has an area of  that includes the Wat Phrathat Doi Suthep temple as well as Bhubing Rjanives Palace, further up the mountain.

Doi Pui, the other peak of the massif, is close by via a paved road as well as through forest paths. Hmong hill tribe people live in the surrounding area.

Environment
The chief of Doi Suthep-Pui National Park voiced his concerns in 2018 about the increasing amount of garbage produced by the large number of tourists visiting Doi Suthep temple, a must-see site for Chiang Mai tourists. Untreated water and garbage from more than 300 shops and a large number of tourists is damaging the area's natural environment. Untreated waste water flows directly into the Huai Rap Sadet Waterfall. The annual Visakha Bucha pilgrimage up Doi Suthep leaves more than 30 tonnes of garbage in its wake.

Housing Project 
The Thai government began building a customary housing project for justice officials on forested land owned by the Treasury Department in 2015. The project was going to include 13 flats for general staff in one area and 45 houses for judges and senior officials in another. There was media based activism and street protests mobilizing against the project because of environmental concerns. As of May 2018 the Thai government has agreed to stop the infrastructural project and reforestation began.

References

External links

Thanon Thong Chai Range
Geography of Chiang Mai province
Mountains of Thailand